Hesperocorixa castanea is a species of water boatman in the family Corixidae in the order Hemiptera.

References

Insects described in 1869
Corixini